Ian Geoffrey Rodríguez Wright (born 28 July 2000) is a Guatemalan racing driver who is currently driving in the Formula Regional Americas Championship for Newman Wachs Racing.

Career

Karting 
Born in Guatemala City, Rodríguez started his karting career in 2010. He competed in karts for four years and won the 2012 Easykart International Grand Finals.

Lower formulae 
In 2016 Rodríguez made his single-seater racing debut in the Italian F4 Championship with DRZ Benelli. In 2017, the Guatemalan won a race at Vallelunga, and after another podium in the final race of the season at Monza Rodríguez finished seventh in the drivers' standings. He stayed on with the team for another year of Italian F4. Rodríguez fell back in the championship, with ninth in the standings, however he did finish on the podium thrice that season.

In 2019 Rodríguez made a one-off appearance in the Italian series, finishing in the points in two of the three races he competed in.

Indy Pro 2000 Championship 
Rodríguez made his Indy Pro 2000 Championship debut at Indianapolis with RP Motorsport Racing. He raced in four weekends and scored two podiums. The Guatemalan finished 13th in the standings.

Formula Regional European Championship 
In 2020 Rodríguez made his debut in the Formula Regional European Championship for DP Formula RP Motorsport in a cameo appearance at Imola. He managed to surprise everyone, winning the first race of the weekend and getting second place in race two. At the end of the year Rodríguez had scored 45 points and finished 13th in the championship.

Racing record

Career summary 

* Season still in progress.

Complete Italian F4 Championship results 
(key) (Races in bold indicate pole position) (Races in italics indicate fastest lap)

Complete Formula Regional European Championship results 
(key) (Races in bold indicate pole position) (Races in italics indicate fastest lap)

Complete European Le Mans Series results

References

External links 
 

2000 births
Living people
Sportspeople from Guatemala City
Italian F4 Championship drivers
Formula Regional European Championship drivers
Formula Regional Americas Championship drivers
Indy Pro 2000 Championship drivers
RP Motorsport drivers
Newman Wachs Racing drivers
European Le Mans Series drivers
Guatemalan racing drivers
Le Mans Cup drivers